Michael Jay Krasny (born September 22, 1944) is a professor and retired American radio host of Forum, a news and public affairs program on San Francisco public radio station KQED-FM, covering current events, politics, and culture from 1993 to 2021. Additionally, Krasny is currently a professor of English literature at San Francisco State University.

Early life 
Born in Cleveland and raised in Cleveland Heights, Ohio, Krasny is a second-generation American whose grandparents immigrated from Russia and Lithuania and grew up in a Jewish household.

Michael is among the outstanding graduates of Cleveland Heights High School (class of 1962) featured in the book Every Tiger Has a Tale. Despite his intellectual reputation today, Krasny admits to having had a "bad boy" reputation while growing up in Cleveland Heights.

Career
In the late 1970s, Krasny hosted a weekly Marin County talk show called "Beyond the Hot Tub" on low-power rock radio station KTIM-FM. He went on to host a popular radio program on KGO (AM) from 1984 to December 1992. He became the host of Forum in 1993, expanding the focus of the program to more national themes. On November 9, 2020, Krasny announced that he would retire from Forum on February 15, 2021. His last Forum broadcast was on February 12, 2021.

Krasny is a professor of English at San Francisco State University where he has taught primarily American literature since 1970. He received his B.A. cum laude in 1966 and M.A. in 1967 from Ohio University, where he attended the Honors College and became a member of Phi Beta Kappa. He holds a Ph.D. in 20th century American literature from the University of Wisconsin–Madison.

Krasny is a widely published scholar, critic and fiction writer. He has also worked widely as a facilitator and host in the corporate sector and as a moderator for nonprofit events.

Personal life
Krasny is a long-time resident of Greenbrae, California. SFSU Online Magazine reports that Krasny's wife is an attorney and an alumna of San Francisco State University, and that Krasny has two daughters.

In his 2010 book, Spiritual Envy, Krasny revealed that he became agnostic later in life.

Bibliography

References

External links
 Official Michael Krasny website
 Michael Krasny biography at KQED-FM
 Office Hours: Focus on Michael Krasny
 Michael Krasny faculty profile at San Francisco State University
 Forum official webpage
 2011 Interview with Michael Krasny
 

American agnostics
American memoirists
American short story writers
American talk radio hosts
American television talk show hosts
American male journalists
Jewish American journalists
Journalists from the San Francisco Bay Area
San Francisco State University faculty
KQED Inc.
Writers from Ohio
University of Wisconsin–Madison College of Letters and Science alumni
Ohio University alumni
Radio personalities from San Francisco
Television personalities from San Francisco
American male short story writers
People from Greenbrae, California
American people of Lithuanian-Jewish descent
American people of Russian-Jewish descent
Jewish agnostics
People from Cleveland Heights, Ohio
Cleveland Heights High School alumni
1944 births
Living people